Atylotus bicolor is a species of horse fly in the family Tabanidae. The species typically breeds in freshwater marshes. Larvae can be found in bogs, swamps, or in the soil of a riparian zone.

Distribution
United States

References

Tabanidae
Insects described in 1821
Diptera of North America
Taxa named by Christian Rudolph Wilhelm Wiedemann